The Manhattan Transfer Meets Tubby The Tuba is a children's studio album released by The Manhattan Transfer in 1995 on the Atlantic Records label.   It features music by George Kleinsinger and stories by Paul Tripp.  This is the group's only children's recording, offering a rendition of the 1945 children's classic that teaches the important lesson: "Be yourself; you can't be anybody else!"

Track listing
 "Tubby the Tuba" (13:55)
 "Tubby at the Circus" (10:59)
 "Tubby Meets a Jazz Band" (11:37)
 "The Further Adventures of Tubby the Tuba" (16:23)

References and sources
 The Manhattan Transfer Official Website

The Manhattan Transfer albums
1995 albums
Albums produced by Norman Newell
Atlantic Records albums
Children's music albums